Albert Jean Martin Grisar (26 September 1870, in Antwerp – 15 October 1930, in Antwerp) was a sailor from Belgium, who represented his native country at the 1920 Summer Olympics in Ostend, Belgium in the 8 Metre.

Further reading

References

1870 births
1930 deaths
Sportspeople from Antwerp
Sailors at the 1920 Summer Olympics – 8 Metre
Belgian male sailors (sport)
Olympic sailors of Belgium
Olympic bronze medalists for Belgium
Olympic medalists in sailing
Medalists at the 1920 Summer Olympics
20th-century Belgian people